Indrė Valaitė (born April 15, 1983) is a Lithuanian orienteering competitor. She received a silver medal in the short course at the 2002 Junior World Orienteering Championships in Alicante.

Her best result at the senior world championships is an 8th place in the relay in Aarhus 2006. She participated in the Orienteering World Cup in 2006, 2007 and 2008.

References

External links
 

1983 births
Living people
Lithuanian orienteers
Female orienteers
Foot orienteers
Junior World Orienteering Championships medalists